Amudha Oru Aacharyakuri is a 2012 Indian Tamil-language soap opera starring Renuka, Kavithalaya Krishnan, Kavya, Sonia and Afser. It broadcast on Kalaignar TV on Monday to Friday from 4 June 2012 to June 2014 at 19:00 (IST) for 266 Episodes. From 2014 to 20 July 2015 the show was re launched in Kalaignar TV at 12:30PM (IST).

The show is Kavithalayaa Productions has been directed by K. Balachander and Ashwin and produced by Pushpa Kandasamy. It is one of K. Balachander's last projects before his death on 23 December 2014.

Cast

Main
 Renuka as Amutha
 Kavithalaya Krishnan 
 Sonia

Supporting
 Kavya 
 Afser 
 Saakshi Siva 
 Shilpa 
 Vasanth 
 Venkat 
 Saran Shakthi
 Kannika Ravi 
 Vijay Krishnaraj
 Sujatha 
 Sruti 
  Myna Nandhini
 Master Charan

Guest appearances
 Viji Chandrasekhar

Casting
The series is a Family story. Actress Renuka makes a comeback after a long break, as Amudha. Kavithalaya Krishnan plays her husband. The cast includes Sonia, Afsar, Shilpa, Vasanth, Venkat, Kanika, Vijay Krishnaraj, Sujatha, Sruti and Master Charan.

Title song
It was written by lyricist Vaali, composed Kannan sung by Srimathumitha.

Soundtrack

Awards

International broadcast
The Series was released on 4 June 2012 on Kalaignar TV. The Show was also broadcast internationally on Channel's international distribution. It aired in Sri Lanka, Singapore, Malaysia, South East Asia, Middle East, Oceania, South Africa and Sub Saharan Africa on Kalaignar TV and also aired in United States, Canada, Europe on Kalaignar Ayngaran TV. The drama is episodes on their Kalaignar TV Official YouTube Channel.

References

External links
 

Kalaignar TV television series
2012 Tamil-language television series debuts
2014 Tamil-language television series debuts
2010s Tamil-language television series
Tamil-language television shows
2013 Tamil-language television series endings
2015 Tamil-language television series endings